XS Airboat Racing is an racing video game developed by Miracle Designs and published by XS Games exclusively for the PlayStation.

External links
 

Cancelled Game Boy Advance games
Miracle Designs games
Motorboat racing video games
PlayStation (console) games
PlayStation (console)-only games
Single-player video games
Video games developed in Belgium
XS Games games